Terence John Norman Simpson (born 8 October 1938) is an English retired professional footballer of the 1950s and 1960s. He played for Southampton, Peterborough United, West Bromwich Albion, Walsall, and Gillingham in a 14-year professional career. His career was ended by a broken leg sustained in March 1969, after which he became Gillingham's first team trainer.

In 1971, he returned to his native Hampshire, where he worked at the Ford Transit plant at Swaythling and played amateur football in the Southampton Saturday Football League.

References

1938 births
Living people
Footballers from Southampton
English footballers
Gillingham F.C. players
Southampton F.C. players
Peterborough United F.C. players
West Bromwich Albion F.C. players
Walsall F.C. players
Eastleigh F.C. players
English Football League players
Association football defenders